The 1858–59 United States House of Representatives elections were held on various dates in various states between June 7, 1858 and December 1, 1859. Each state set its own date for its elections to the House of Representatives. 238 representatives were elected in the new state of Oregon, the pending new state of Kansas, and the other 32 states before the first session of the 36th United States Congress convened on December 5, 1859. They were held during President James Buchanan's term.

Winning a plurality for the first time, Republicans benefited from multiple factors including the collapse of the nativist American Party, sectional strife in the Democratic Party, Northern voter dissatisfaction with the infamous March 1857 Dred Scott Supreme Court decision, political exposure of Democrats to chaotic violence in Kansas amid repeated attempts to impose slavery against the express will of a majority of its settlers, and a sharp decline in President Buchanan's popularity due to his perceived fecklessness.  In Pennsylvania, his home state, Republicans made particularly large gains.

The pivotal Dred Scott decision was only the second time the Supreme Court had overturned law on Constitutional grounds. The decision created apprehension in the North, where slavery had ceased to exist, that a ruling in a different case widely expected to be heard by the Supreme Court would strike down any limitations on slavery anywhere in the United States.

Short of a majority, Republicans controlled the House with limited cooperation from smaller parties also opposing the Democrats. Republicans were united in opposing slavery in the territories and fugitive slave laws, while rejecting the abrogation of the Missouri Compromise, key aspects of the Compromise of 1850, the Kansas-Nebraska Act, and the Dred Scott decision. Though not yet abolitionist, Republicans openly derived a primary partisan purpose from hostility to slavery while furnishing a mainstream platform for abolitionism.  None of the party's views or positions was new.  However, their catalytic cohesion into a unified political vehicle, and the bold dismissal of the South, represented a newly disruptive political force.

Democrats remained divided and politically trapped. Fifteen Democratic members publicly defied their party label. Of seven Independent Democrats, six represented Southern districts. Eight Northern Anti-Lecompton Democrats favored a ban on slavery in Kansas, effectively upholding the Missouri Compromise their party had destroyed several years earlier.  Democrats lacked credible leadership and continued to drift in a direction favorable to the interests of slavery despite obviously widening and intensifying Northern opposition to the expansion of those interests. A damaging public perception also existed that President Buchanan had improperly influenced and endorsed the Dred Scott decision, incorrectly believing that it had solved his main political problem. Such influence would violate the separation of powers. The wide gap between Democratic rhetoric and results alienated voters, while defeat in the North and intra-party defection combined to make the Party both more Southern and more radical.

Democrats lost seats in some slave states as the disturbing turn of national events and surge in sectional tensions alarmed a significant minority of Southern voters. Southern politicians opposing both Democrats and extremism, but unwilling to affiliate with Republicans, ran on the Southern Opposition Party ticket (not to be conflated with the Opposition Party of 1854).

For 11 states, this was the last full congressional election until the Reconstruction. Twenty-nine elected members quit near the end of the session following their states' secession from the Union, whose immediate motivation was the result of the election of 1860.

Election summaries
One seat each was added for the new states of Oregon and Kansas.

Special elections 

There were special elections in 1858 and 1859 to the 35th United States Congress and 36th United States Congress.

Special elections are sorted by date then district.

35th Congress 

|-
! 
| Nathaniel P. Banks
|  | Republican
| 1852
|  | Incumbent resigned December 24, 1857 to become Governor of Massachusetts.New member elected in December 1857 or January 1858.Republican hold.Successor seated January 21, 1858.Successor already elected to the next term, see below.
| nowrap | 

|-
! 
| Thomas L. Clingman
|  | Democratic
| 1852
|  | Incumbent resigned May 7, 1858 to become U.S. Senator.New member elected August 5, 1858Know Nothing gain.Successor seated December 7, 1858.Successor later elected to the next term, see below.
| nowrap | 

|-
! 
| John A. Quitman
|  | Democratic
| 1855
|  | Incumbent died July 17, 1858.New member elected October 4, 1858.Democratic hold.Successor seated December 7, 1858.Successor later elected to the next term, see below.
| nowrap | 

|-
! 
| J. Glancy Jones
|  | Democratic
| 1850
|  | Incumbent resigned October 30, 1858.New member elected November 30, 1858.Republican gain.Successor seated December 7, 1858.Successor not elected to the next term, see below.
| nowrap | 

|-
! 
| Thomas L. Harris
|  | Democratic
| 1854
|  | Incumbent died November 24, 1858.New member elected January 4, 1859.Democratic hold.Successor seated January 20, 1859.Successor not elected to the next term, see below.
| nowrap | 

|-
! 
| John Kelly
|  | Democratic
| 1854
|  | Incumbent resigned December 25, 1858.New member elected January 4, 1859.Independent Democratic gain.Successor seated January 17, 1859.Successor was also elected to the next term, see below.
| nowrap | 

|}

36th Congress 

|-
! 
| Cyrus Spink
|  | Republican
| 1858
|  | Incumbent died May 31, 1859.New member elected October 11, 1859.Republican hold.Successor seated December 5, 1859.
| nowrap | 

|-
! 
| William Goode
|  | Democratic
| 1853
|  | Incumbent died May 31, 1859.New member elected October 27, 1859.Democratic hold.Successor seated December 7, 1859.
| nowrap | 

|-
! 
| Thomas L. Harris
|  | Democratic
| 1854
|  | Incumbent died November 24, 1858.New member elected November 8, 1859.Democratic hold.Successor seated December 5, 1859.
| nowrap | 

|}

Alabama 

|-
! 

|-
! 

|-
! 

|-
! 

|-
! 

|-
! 

|-
! 

|}

Arkansas 

|-
! 

|-
! 

|}

California 

California held its election September 7, 1859. From statehood to 1864, California's members were elected at-large, with the top finishers winning election.

|-
! rowspan=2 | 
| Charles L. Scott
|  | Democratic
| 1856
| Incumbent re-elected.
| rowspan=2 nowrap | 

|-
| Joseph C. McKibbin
|  | Anti-LecomptonDemocratic
| 1856
|  | Incumbent lost re-election.New member elected.Democratic hold.

|}

Connecticut 

|-
! 

|-
! 

|-
! 

|}

Delaware 

|-
! 
| William G. Whiteley
|  | Democratic
| 1856
| Incumbent re-elected.
| nowrap | 

|}

Florida 

|-
! 
| George S. Hawkins
|  | Democratic
| 1856
| Incumbent re-elected.
|  nowrap | 

|}

Georgia 

|-
! 

|-
! 

|-
! 

|-
! 

|-
! 

|-
! 

|-
! 

|-
! 

|}

Illinois 

|-
! 

|-
! 

|-
! 

|-
! 

|-
! 

|-
! 

|-
! 

|-
! 

|-
! 

|}

Indiana 

|-
! 

|-
! 

|-
! 

|-
! 

|-
! 

|-
! 

|-
! 

|-
! 

|-
! 

|-
! 

|-
! 

|}

Iowa 

|-
! 

|-
! 

|}

Kansas 

|-
! 
| colspan=3 | New state 
|  | New seat.New member elected December 1, 1859 in advance of January 29, 1861 statehood.Republican gain.
| nowrap | 

|}

Kansas Territory 
See non-voting delegates, below.

Kentucky 

|-
! 

|-
! 

|-
! 

|-
! 

|-
! 

|-
! 

|-
! 

|}

Louisiana 

|-
! 
| George Eustis Jr.
|  | Know Nothing
| Elected in 1854
| bgcolor=lavender | Incumbent retired.New member elected.Know Nothing hold.
| nowrap | 
|-
! 
| Miles Taylor
|  | Democratic
| Elected in 1854
| Incumbent re-elected.
| nowrap | 
|-
! 
| Thomas Green Davidson
|  | Democratic
| Elected in 1854
| Incumbent re-elected.
| nowrap | 
|-
! 
| John M. Sandidge
|  | Democratic
| Elected in 1854
|  | Incumbent retired.New member elected.Democratic hold.
| nowrap | 
|}

Maine 

|-
! 

|-
! 

|-
! 

|-
! 

|-
! 

|-
! 

|}

Maryland 

|-
! 

|-
! 

|-
! 

|-
! 

|-
! 

|-
! 

|}

Massachusetts 

|-
! 

|-
! 

|-
! 

|-
! 

|-
! 

|-
! 

|-
! 

|-
! 

|-
! 

|-
! 

|-
! 

|}

Michigan 

|-
! rowspan=2 | 
| rowspan=2 | William A. Howard
| rowspan=2 
| rowspan=2 | 1854
|  | Incumbent lost re-election.New member elected.Democratic gain.
| nowrap | 
|-
|  | Election successfully contested.Incumbent re-seated May 15, 1860.
| nowrap | 

|-
! 
| Henry Waldron
| 
| 1854
| Incumbent re-elected.
| nowrap | 

|-
! 
| David S. Walbridge
| 
| 1854
|  | Incumbent retired.New member elected.Republican hold.
| nowrap | 

|-
! 
| Dewitt C. Leach
| 
| 1856
| Incumbent re-elected.
| nowrap | 

|}

Michigan voted in 3 Republicans and 1 Democrat in the first elections of this Midterm. The only district to vote in favor of the Democratic Party's candidate was the First, which encompassed the modern-day counties of Wayne, Washtenaw, Livingston, and Jackson.

Minnesota 

Minnesota became a new state in 1858 having already elected its first two members at-large in October 1857 to finish the current term.  The state then held elections to the next term October 4, 1859.

|-
! rowspan=2 | 
| James M. Cavanaugh
|  | Democratic
| 1857
|  | Incumbent lost re-election.New member elected.Republican gain.
| rowspan=2 nowrap | 

|-
| William Wallace Phelps
|  | Democratic
| 1857
|  | Unknown if incumbent retired or lost re-election.New member elected.Republican gain.

|}

Mississippi 

Elections held late, on October 3, 1859.

|-
! 
| Lucius Q. C. Lamar
|  | Democratic
| 1857
| Incumbent re-elected.
| nowrap |   Lucius Q. C. Lamar (Democratic) 100%

|-
! 
| Reuben Davis
|  | Democratic
| 1857
| Incumbent re-elected.
| nowrap | 

|-
! 
| William Barksdale
|  | Democratic
| 1853
| Incumbent re-elected.
| nowrap |   William Barksdale (Democratic) 100%

|-
! 
| Otho R. Singleton
|  | Democratic
| 1857
| Incumbent re-elected.
| nowrap | 

|-
! 
| John J. McRae
|  | Democratic
| 1858 (special)
| Incumbent re-elected.
| nowrap |   John J. McRae (Democratic) 100%

|}

Missouri 

|-
! 

|-
! 

|-
! 

|-
! 

|-
! 

|-
! 

|-
! 

|}

Nebraska Territory 
See non-voting delegates, below.

New Hampshire 

|-
! 

|-
! 

|-
! 

|}

New Jersey 

|-
! 

|-
! 

|-
! 

|-
! 

|-
! 

|}

New York 

|-
! 

|-
! 

|-
! 

|-
! 

|-
! 

|-
! 

|-
! 

|-
! 

|-
! 

|-
! 

|-
! 

|-
! 

|-
! 

|-
! 

|-
! 

|-
! 

|-
! 

|-
! 

|-
! 

|-
! 

|-
! 

|-
! 

|-
! 

|-
! 

|-
! 

|-
! 

|-
! 

|-
! 

|-
! 

|-
! 

|-
! 

|-
! 

|-
! 

|}

North Carolina 

|-
! 

|-
! 

|-
! 

|-
! 

|-
! 

|-
! 

|-
! 

|-
! 

|}

Ohio 

Ohio elected its members October 12, 1858, netting a 3-seat Republican gain.

|-
! 
| George H. Pendleton
|  | Democratic
| 1856
| Incumbent re-elected.
| nowrap | 

|-
! 
| William S. Groesbeck
|  | Democratic
| 1856
|  | Incumbent lost re-election.New member elected.Republican gain.
| nowrap | 

|-
! 
| Clement L. Vallandigham
|  | Democratic
| 1856
| Incumbent re-elected.
| nowrap | 

|-
! 
| Matthias H. Nichols
|  | Republican
| 1852
|  | Incumbent lost re-election.New member elected.Democratic gain.
| nowrap | 

|-
! 
| Richard Mott
|  | Republican
| 1854
|  | Incumbent retired.New member elected.Republican hold.
| nowrap | 

|-
! 
| Joseph R. Cockerill
|  | Democratic
| 1856
|  | Incumbent retired.New member elected.Democratic hold.
| nowrap | 

|-
! 
| Aaron Harlan
|  | Republican
| 1852
|  | Incumbent lost renomination.New member elected.Republican hold.
| nowrap | 

|-
! 
| Benjamin Stanton
|  | Republican
| 1854
| Incumbent re-elected.
| nowrap | 

|-
! 
| Lawrence W. Hall
|  | Democratic
| 1856
|  | Incumbent lost re-election.New member elected.Republican gain.
| nowrap | 

|-
! 
| Joseph Miller
|  | Democratic
| 1856
|  | Incumbent lost re-election.New member elected.Republican gain.
| nowrap | 

|-
! 
| Albert C. Thompson
|  | Republican
| 1854
|  | Incumbent retired.New member elected.Democratic gain.
| nowrap | 

|-
! 
| Samuel S. Cox
|  | Democratic
| 1856
| Incumbent re-elected.
| nowrap | 

|-
! 
| John Sherman
|  | Republican
| 1854
| Incumbent re-elected.
| nowrap | 

|-
! 
| Philemon Bliss
|  | Republican
| 1854
|  | Incumbent retired.New member elected.Republican hold.Successor died May 31, 1859, leading to a special election.
| nowrap | 

|-
! 
| Joseph Burns
|  | Democratic
| 1856
|  | Incumbent lost re-election.New member elected.Republican gain.
| nowrap | 

|-
! 
| Cydnor B. Tompkins
|  | Republican
| 1856
| Incumbent re-elected.
| nowrap | 

|-
! 
| William Lawrence
|  | Democratic
| 1856
|  | Incumbent retired.New member elected.Republican gain.
| nowrap | 

|-
! 
| Benjamin F. Leiter
|  | Republican
| 1854
|  | Incumbent retired.New member elected.Republican hold.
| nowrap | 

|-
! 
| Edward Wade
|  | Republican
| 1852
| Incumbent re-elected.
| nowrap | 

|-
! 
| Joshua Reed Giddings
|  | Republican
| 1843
|  | Incumbent lost renomination.New member elected.Republican hold.
| nowrap | 

|-
! 
| John Bingham
|  | Republican
| 1854
| Incumbent re-elected.
| nowrap | 

|}

Oregon

35th Congress 

|-
! 
| colspan=3 | New state 
|  | New seat.New member elected June 7, 1858.Democratic gain.Successor seated February 14, 1859.New member did not run for the next term.
| nowrap | 

|}

36th Congress 

|-
! 
| colspan=3 | New state
|  | New seat.New member elected.Democratic hold.New member did not run for the current term.
| nowrap | 

|}

Pennsylvania 

|-
! 

|-
! 

|-
! 

|-
! 

|-
! 

|-
! 

|-
! 

|-
! 

|-
! 

|-
! 

|-
! 

|-
! 

|-
! 

|-
! 

|-
! 

|-
! 

|-
! 

|-
! 

|-
! 

|-
! 

|-
! 

|-
! 

|-
! 

|-
! 

|-
! 

|}

Rhode Island 

|-
! 

|-
! 

|}

South Carolina 

|-
! 

|-
! 

|-
! 

|-
! 

|-
! 

|-
! 

|}

Tennessee 

Elections held late, on August 4, 1859.

|-
! 
| Albert G. Watkins
|  | Democratic
| 1855
|  |Incumbent retired.New member elected.Opposition gain.
| nowrap | 

|-
! 
| Horace Maynard
|  | Know Nothing
| 1857
|  |Incumbent re-elected.Opposition gain.
| nowrap | 

|-
! 
| Samuel A. Smith
|  | Democratic
| 1853
|  |Incumbent lost re-election.New member elected.Opposition gain.
| nowrap | 

|-
! 
| John H. Savage
|  | Democratic
| 1855
|  |Incumbent lost re-election.New member elected.Opposition gain.
|  nowrap | 

|-
! 
| Charles Ready
|  | Know Nothing
| 1853
|  |Incumbent lost re-election as an independent.New member elected.Opposition gain.
| nowrap | 

|-
! 
| George W. Jones
|  | Democratic
| 1842
|  |Incumbent retired.New member elected.Democratic hold.
|  

|-
! 
| John V. Wright
|  | Democratic
| 1855
| Incumbent re-elected.
| nowrap | 

|-
! 
| Felix Zollicoffer
|  | Know Nothing
| 1853
|  |Incumbent retired.New member elected.Opposition gain.
| nowrap | 

|-
! 
| John D.C. Atkins
|  | Democratic
| 1857
|  |Incumbent lost re-election.New member elected.Opposition gain.
| nowrap | 

|-
! 
| William T. Avery
|  | Democratic
| 1857
| Incumbent re-elected.
| nowrap | 

|}

Texas 

|-
! 

|-
! 

|}

Vermont 

|-
! 

|-
! 

|-
! 

|}

Virginia 

|-
! 

|-
! 

|-
! 

|-
! 

|-
! 

|-
! 

|-
! 

|-
! 

|-
! 

|-
! 

|-
! 

|-
! 

|-
! 

|}

Wisconsin 

|-
! 
| John F. Potter
|  | Republican
| 1856
| Incumbent re-elected.
| nowrap | 

|-
! 
| Cadwallader C. Washburn
|  | Republican
| 1854
| Incumbent re-elected.
| nowrap | 

|-
! 
| Charles Billinghurst
|  | Republican 
| 1854
|  | Incumbent lost re-election.New member elected.Democratic gain.
| nowrap | 

|}

Non-voting delegates 

|-
! 
| Marcus Junius Parrott
|  | Republican
| 1856 or 1857
| Incumbent re-elected in 1858 or 1859.
| nowrap | 

|-
! 
| Fenner Ferguson
|  | Independent Democratic
| 1857
|  | Incumbent retired.New delegate elected October 11, 1859.Democratic gain.Election was later overturned due to a successful challenge by the loser.
| nowrap | 

|}

See also
 1858 United States elections
 1858–59 United States Senate elections
 35th United States Congress
 36th United States Congress

Notes

References

Bibliography

External links
 Office of the Historian (Office of Art & Archives, Office of the Clerk, U.S. House of Representatives)